Muscovy is an alternative name for the Grand Duchy of Moscow (1263–1547) and the Tsardom of Russia (1547–1721). 

It may also refer to:
Muscovy Company, an English trading company chartered in 1555
Muscovy duck (Cairina moschata) and Domestic Muscovy duck (Cairina moschata domestica)
Muscovy glass, or muscovite, a mineral
Muscovy, a "parallel world" Russia in Phillip Pullman's His Dark Materials
Moscovia, a historical region in Central Russia.

See also
Moscobia Convent, a convent established by the Russian Orthodox Church in Ein Karem
Moskovia Airlines, a defunct Russian airline